Cara-Friend was set up in 1974 "as a voluntary counseling, befriending, information, health and social space organisation for the Lesbian, Gay, Bisexual & Trans (LGB&T) community" in Northern Ireland.

Cara-Friend has a youth section for anyone between the ages of 12 and 25 who identifies as non-heterosexual or is questioning their sexual identity and offers support and help to them. Cara-Friend is well known as one of the most prominent groups for LGBT youth in Northern Ireland and has released "What's In Your Closet?" - a guide for parents, teachers and students to coming out.

References

External links
Cara-Friend

1974 establishments in Northern Ireland
LGBT organisations in Northern Ireland
LGBT youth organisations based in the United Kingdom
Youth organisations based in Northern Ireland